Samo is a given name which may refer to:

Samo (7th Century CE), First ruler of Slavic tribes in Greater Moravia
Samo Chalupka (1812–1883), Slovak romantic poet
Samo Kuščer (born 1952), Slovenian physicist and writer
Samo Tomášik (1813–1887), Slovak romantic poet and writer
Samo Udrih (born 1979), Slovenian basketball player
Samo Vidovič (born 1968), Slovenian retired footballer
Samo (born 1975), Mexican singer

Slovak masculine given names
Slovene masculine given names